This was the first edition of the tournament and was part of the 2022 Legión Sudamericana.

João Domingues won the title after defeating Tomás Barrios Vera 7–6(11–9), 6–1 in the final.

Seeds

Draw

Finals

Top half

Bottom half

References

External links
Main draw
Qualifying draw

Salvador Challenger - 1
Salvador Challenger